The Willamette Floodplain consists of  of natural grassland, near the Willamette River, that was made a National Natural Landmark in May 1987.

It is the largest remaining native unplowed example of bottomland interior valley grassland in the North Pacific Border natural region. It was classified as a natural landmark because such grassland and shrubland areas are exceedingly rare, with most having been cultivated or turned into pastureland.

References

External links
 Map of William L. Finley National Wildlife Refuge. U.S. Fish and Wildlife Service

Willamette Valley
Willamette River
Grasslands of Oregon
Regions of Oregon
National Natural Landmarks in Oregon
Landforms of Benton County, Oregon
Wetlands of Oregon
Floodplains of the United States